Matunga (Marathi pronunciation: [maːʈuŋɡaː]) is a locality in the heart of Mumbai City towards downtown Mumbai. It is serviced by the Matunga Road station on the Western line, Matunga station on the Central Line and King's Circle station on the Harbour Line.

Geographically, Matunga is surrounded by the Sion-Dharavi belt to the North, Mahim to the North-West, GTB Nagar to the North-East, Wadala to the East and Dadar to the South.

History 

Matunga formed a part of the seven original islands of Mumbai with Mahim, then known as Mahikavati. It is said that the King of Mahikavati had his elephant stables in Matunga, and that the name Matunga was derived from "Matanga", the Sanskrit word for Elephant.

Matunga was among the first well planned localities of Mumbai. The Dadar-Matunga-Wadala-Sion plan of 1899-1900 was formulated to evenly distribute population as well as provide better living standards. Matunga has a juxtaposition of Irani cafes and Udupis and houses one of the oldest residents of Mumbai.

The Dadar-Matunga-Wadala-Sion scheme of 1899-1900 was the first planned suburban scheme in Bombay. The City Improvement Trust formulated this plan in order to relieve congestion in the centre of the town, following the plague epidemics of the 1890s. According to the survey plan, 60,000 people were to be housed at Dadar-Matunga and an equal number in Sion-Matunga. 85,000 people were to be accommodated in the developments in Sewri-Wadala. The plans regulated constructions with emphasis on proper sanitation. No building was to be more than three storeys high, and the buildings were to have open spaces between them. The land-use was planned to be a mix of residential, commercial and institutional constructions. Parks and gardens were planned, and the streets were well laid out.

440 acres of land was procured and leased to the Government for selling. For the first time housing cooperatives were formed to take advantage of newly developed land. The Parsi and Hindu colonies in Dadar and the Tamil colony in Matunga were developed in this way.

Among the institutions which moved here according to the CIT plan were the VJTI and King George's School.

Demographics 
Matunga has a large population of South Indians especially, Tamil Brahmins, who have been residing here for several decades. An effect of this has been a good number of traditional south Indian temples and restaurants serving authentic South Indian dishes that can be found in the area. The number of Gujaratis has also been on the rise in recent years. One of the earliest Gujaratis to come to Matunga were from the Kapol community. They built the Kapol Hostel and Kapol Niwas in Matunga.

Matunga, having a predominantly Hindu population, also has a sizeable presence of Marathis, Bengalis and members of the Parsi community.

Culture 
Matunga has numerous temples, namely, the Astika Samajam, the South Indian Bhajan Samaj, Sri Sankara Matham, Sri Kanyaka Parmeshwari Temple, The Church of Mary, Help of Christians (also known as Don Bosco Church), the Jain temples in Kings Circle and the Marubai Temple.

There is also the Matunga Mosque which is an important place of worship for members of the Muslim community.

The Shanmukhananda Auditorium and Mysore Auditorium, a major cultural centre lies on the border of Matunga and Sion. Matunga also houses multiple cultural centres, namely, the Mysore Association, the Gujarati Seva Mandal and the Karnataka Sangh Hall in Matunga West.

Matunga is known for its eateries serving south Indian food.

Ganesh Chaturthi is celebrated on a large scale in Matunga, with multiple Ganesh Mandals that are beautifully decorated during the 10 day festival.

Matunga market 

The Lal Bahadur Shastri Market in Matunga is the main market of Matunga, housing multiple shops and hawkers selling vegetables, clothes, jewellery and groceries. Matunga East does not house either a meat market or a fish market and the nearest shops for poultry and fish are in Matunga West, Wadala and Dadar.

The flower market of Matunga is famous for its South Indian essence and is quite well known in Mumbai.

Educational institutions 
The Veermata Jijabai Technological Institute (VJTI), Institute of Chemical Technology (erstwhile University Department of Chemical Technology), Guru Nanak Khalsa College, R.A. Podar College, Ramnarain Ruia College, and Welingkar Institute of Management are some of higher education institutions located in Matunga. These institutions are accredited by the National Assessment and Accreditation Council (NAAC).

Some of the other schools nearby are South Indian Education Society High School, J.B.Vacha School in Dadar Parsi Colony, and King George School nearby in Dadar, which is on the border of Matunga and Dadar.

In 1937, the general council of Salesians of Don Bosco approved a plan to buy  land in Matunga from the Bombay Municipal Corporation. The Corporation approved the sale on 16 July 1937. The Salesians bought the land for ₹229,160. The Don Bosco High School (formerly known as The Catholic Educational Institute) run by them was shifted from the rented premises at Tardeo to the new Don Bosco campus at Matunga.

Matunga boarding which was known as Shri Hirji Bhojraj & Sons KVO Jain Chhatralaya was established in 1915. This campus also houses Shishuvan school.

Sports facilities 
The Matunga Gymkhana and associated ground is a home for budding cricketers. Similarly, Matunga Gymkhana has facilities for Tennis, Squash, Swimming and Badminton. Indian Gymkhana in Matunga is a preferred venue for Cricket and Basketball training.

The Indian Gymkhana has facilities for basketball, swimming, tennis, badminton, cricket, etc.

The Don Bosco School has multiple facilities for football, cricket and basketball.

References

Mumbai City district
Neighbourhoods in Mumbai